Bruno Cenghialta (born 5 December 1962) is a retired Italian professional road bicycle racer.

Cenghialta was born at Montecchio Maggiore. After his cycling career, Cenghialta became directeur sportif. From 2006 Cenghialta was directeur sportif of Acqua & Sapone–Caffè Mokambo. In 2014 Cenghialta joined Team Tinkoff–Saxo.

Career achievements

Major results

1988
Schwanenbrau Cup
1991
Tour de France:
Winner stage 14
1994
Coppa Bernocchi

Grand Tour general classification results timeline

;

References

External links 

Official Tour de France results for Bruno Cenghialta

1962 births
Living people
Cyclists from the Province of Vicenza
Italian male cyclists
Italian Tour de France stage winners